The Atlantic Hockey Best Defenseman is an annual award given out at the conclusion of the Atlantic Hockey regular season to the best defenseman in the conference as voted by the coaches of each Atlantic Hockey team.

Award winners

Winners by school

References 

Atlantic Hockey
College ice hockey trophies and awards in the United States
Awards established in 2004